Fritz Zimmermann (born 29 March 1931) is a German former fencer.

Career
Zimmermann won the German national championships in épée in both 1955 and 1957. He represented the United Team of Germany at the 1960 Summer Olympics and competed in the men's team épée, where Germany came equal fifth.

In 1964, Zimmermann was omitted from the Olympic team. The criticism had been leveled against him that he screamed during bouts, a practice that has now become commonplace.

Zimmerman returned to the Olympics in 1968, representing West Germany in both the individual épée and team épée.

References

External links
 

1931 births
Possibly living people
German male fencers
Olympic fencers of the United Team of Germany
Olympic fencers of West Germany
Fencers at the 1960 Summer Olympics
Fencers at the 1968 Summer Olympics
Sportspeople from Düsseldorf
20th-century German people